Shamorie Saequan Ponds (born June 29, 1998) is an American professional basketball player for the Astros de Jalisco of the Liga Nacional de Baloncesto Profesional (LNBP). He played college basketball for the St. John's Red Storm.

High school career
Ponds played high school basketball for Thomas Jefferson High School in Brooklyn, New York, where in 2016 he led the team to its first New York City title since 1954. He chose to attend nearby St. John's to play for coach Chris Mullin.

Ponds was rated as a four-star recruit and ranked 37th overall recruit and 9th best point guard in the 2016 high school class.

College career
As a freshman, Ponds was one of the top freshmen in the Big East Conference, averaging 17.4 points and averaging 3.3 assists as the starting point guard for the Red Storm. At the close of the season, Ponds was named to the conference all-freshman team.

Following his freshman year, Ponds became a top player in the Big East as a sophomore. Ponds made a national name for himself with standout performances in back to back upset wins over fourth-ranked Duke, top-ranked Villanova, as well as scoring 44 points, a Carnesecca Arena record, against the Marquette Golden Eagles.  At the close of the season, Ponds was named first-team All-Big East and won the Haggerty Award as the top college player in the New York City metro area.

Following his sophomore season, Ponds declared his eligibility for the 2018 NBA draft. He did not initially hire an agent.  He decided to return to St. John’s for his junior season. Ponds averaged 19.7 points, 4.1 rebounds, 5.1 assists, and 2.6 steals in 35.1 minutes per game as a junior. He left St. John's for the NBA after the season concluded.

Professional career

Toronto Raptors (2019–2020)
After going undrafted in the 2019 NBA draft, the Houston Rockets signed Ponds to a contract to play in the 2019 NBA Summer League and take part in training camp. He later had his contract converted to a two-way deal, a decision which was later reversed. On October 19, 2019, the Rockets released Ponds.

On October 23, 2019, the Toronto Raptors announced they had signed Ponds to a two-way contract. Under the terms of the deal, he would split time between the Raptors and their NBA G League affiliate, the Raptors 905. On November 27, 2019, Ponds made his NBA debut against the New York Knicks, scoring 4 points and making his first NBA basket. On December 31, 2019, Ponds set a new career high with 5 points against the Cleveland Cavaliers. On January 15, 2020, the Raptors waived Ponds.

Spars (2021)
On February 23, 2021, Spars of the Bosnian League announced they had signed Ponds to for the rest of the 2020–21 season.

Delaware Blue Coats (2021–2022)
Ponds was selected by the Delaware Blue Coats first overall in the 2021 NBA G League draft.

Career statistics

NBA

Regular season

|-
| style="text-align:left;"| 
| style="text-align:left;"| Toronto
| 4 || 0 || 2.8 || .600 || .500 || 1.000 || .3 || .5 || .0 || .3 || 2.3
|- class="sortbottom"
| style="text-align:center;" colspan="2"| Career
| 4 || 0 || 2.8 || .600 || .500 || 1.000 || .3 || .5 || .0 || .3 || 2.3

College

|-
| style="text-align:left;"| 2016–17
| style="text-align:left;"| St. John's
| 33 || 33 || 33.6 || .439 || .375 || .823 || 4.4 || 3.1 || 2.1 || .2 || 17.4
|-
| style="text-align:left;"| 2017–18
| style="text-align:left;"| St. John's
| 30 || 30 || 37.0 || .420 || .253 || .857 || 5.0 || 4.7 || 2.3 || .1 || 21.6
|-
| style="text-align:left;"| 2018–19
| style="text-align:left;"| St. John's
| 33 || 33 || 35.1 || .454 || .353 || .836 || 4.1 || 5.1 || 2.6 || .3 || 19.7
|- class="sortbottom"
| style="text-align:center;" colspan="2"| Career
| 96 || 96 || 35.2 || .437 || .328 || .840 || 4.5 || 4.3 || 2.3 || .2 || 19.5

References

External links
St. John's Red Storm bio

1998 births
Living people
21st-century African-American sportspeople
African-American basketball players
American expatriate basketball people in Bosnia and Herzegovina
American expatriate basketball people in Canada
American men's basketball players
Basketball players from New York City
Delaware Blue Coats players
Point guards
Raptors 905 players
OKK Spars players
Sportspeople from Brooklyn
St. John's Red Storm men's basketball players
Thomas Jefferson High School (Brooklyn) alumni
Toronto Raptors players
Undrafted National Basketball Association players